Deevan Raj a/l Siva Balan (born 29 October 1994) is a Malaysian footballer who plays as a midfielder for Malaysia Premier League club Negeri Sembilan.

Career statistics

Club

References

External links

1994 births
Living people
Malaysia Super League players
Malaysian footballers
PKNP FC players
Negeri Sembilan FC players
Melaka United F.C. players
Malaysian people of Indian descent
Association football wingers
Association football midfielders
People from Perak